Ali Ardalan was an Iranian politician affiliated with the National Front.

He served as the Minister of Finance under Cabinet of Bazargan in 1979 and then was elected to the Parliament in 1980 legislative election, despite getting barred to take his seat.

He served as the chairman of Association for Defense of Freedom and the Sovereignty of the Iranian Nation.

References 

National Front (Iran) politicians
Iran Party politicians
1910s births
2000 deaths
Iranian elected officials who did not take office
Members of the Association for Defense of Freedom and the Sovereignty of the Iranian Nation
People from Hamadan Province
Finance ministers of Iran
20th-century Iranian politicians